Weinmannia richii is a species of plant in the family Cunoniaceae. It is endemic to Fiji.

References

richii
Endemic flora of Fiji
Least concern plants
Least concern biota of Oceania
Taxonomy articles created by Polbot